Bobby Roberts may refer to:
Bobby Roberts (basketball) (1927–2002), American college basketball coach
Bobby Roberts (footballer) (born 1940), Scottish athlete and manager
Bobby Roberts (film producer) (1929–2004), produced many action genre films of the 1970s including Death Wish I & II
Bob Roberts (cinematographer), American-born cinematographer of Argentine cinema in the 1940s
Bobby Ray Roberts (songwriter)  (born 1973) wrote “If I Were You”

See also
Robert Roberts (disambiguation)
Roberts (surname)